Philip Lewis (October 7, 1883 in Pittsburgh, Pennsylvania – August 8, 1959 in Port Wentworth, Georgia), was a professional baseball player who played shortstop from 1905 to 1908 for the Brooklyn Superbas. He attended Cornell University and served in World War I.

External links

1883 births
1959 deaths
Major League Baseball shortstops
Brooklyn Superbas players
Baseball players from Pennsylvania
Cornell Big Red baseball players
Baltimore Orioles (IL) players
Indianapolis Indians players
Milwaukee Brewers (minor league) players
Kansas City Blues (baseball) players